Thompson Ranch was listed on the National Register of Historic Places in or near Cottonwood, Arizona, United States. It was delisted May 23, 2016.

References

Buildings and structures in Yavapai County, Arizona
Ranches on the National Register of Historic Places in Arizona
1900 establishments in Arizona Territory
National Register of Historic Places in Yavapai County, Arizona
Former National Register of Historic Places in Arizona